The Ireland cricket team toured the West Indies in April 2010. They played one One Day International against the West Indies. They also played three Twenty20 matches against a West Indies XI and a single first-class match against Jamaica.

3-day tour match

Jamaica v Ireland

ODI series

Only ODI

Twenty20 series

1st T20

2nd T20

3rd T20

2010 in Irish cricket
2010 in West Indian cricket
2009–10 West Indian cricket season
International cricket competitions in 2009–10
Irish cricket tours of the West Indies